Raimondo D'Inzeo (8 February 1925 – 15 November 2013) was an Italian show jumping rider, an Olympic champion and double world champion. Together with his elder brother Piero D'Inzeo, he was the first athlete to compete in eight consecutive Olympic games, in 1948–1976. At the Rome Olympics in 1960 Raimondo won the gold medal and Piero won the silver in show jumping.

Being an officer in the Carabinieri Cavalry Regiment D'Inzeo always wore a uniform when competing in tournaments. Against the irritable and aggressive temperament of Raimondo, Piero was more technical and calculating.

Achievements 
 Olympic Games
 1956 Stockholm: Silver medal team and individual silver medal on Merano
 1960 Rome: Bronze medal team and individual gold medal on Posillipo
 1964 Tokyo: Bronze medal team on Posillipo
 1972 Munich: Bronze medal team on Fiorello II
 World Championships
 1955 Aachen: Individual silver medal on Merano
 1956 Aachen: Individual gold medal on Merano
 1960 Venice: Individual gold medal on Gowran Girl
 1966 Buenos Aires: Individual bronze medal on Bowjak
 International Grand Prix wins
 1956 Rome on Merano
 1957 Rome on Merano
 1963 Aachen on Posillipo
 1968 Amsterdam on Bellevue
 1969 Dublin on Bellevue
 1971 Rome on Fiorello
 1974 Rome on Gone Away
 1975 Dublin on Bellevue

See also
 List of athletes with the most appearances at Olympic Games
 Italian men gold medalist at the Olympics and World Championships
 Legends of Italian sport - Walk of Fame

References

External links
 

1925 births
2013 deaths
Italian show jumping riders
Olympic equestrians of Italy
Italian male equestrians
Olympic gold medalists for Italy
Olympic silver medalists for Italy
Olympic bronze medalists for Italy
Equestrians at the 1948 Summer Olympics
Equestrians at the 1952 Summer Olympics
Equestrians at the 1956 Summer Olympics
Equestrians at the 1960 Summer Olympics
Equestrians at the 1964 Summer Olympics
Equestrians at the 1968 Summer Olympics
Equestrians at the 1972 Summer Olympics
Equestrians at the 1976 Summer Olympics
Olympic medalists in equestrian
Equestrians of Centro Sportivo Carabinieri
Medalists at the 1956 Summer Olympics
Medalists at the 1960 Summer Olympics
Medalists at the 1964 Summer Olympics
Medalists at the 1972 Summer Olympics